Vainu'u "Vinnie" Kruse-Miller (previously Kruse) is a fictional character from the New Zealand soap opera Shortland Street, played by Pua Magasiva. Vinnie first arrived on 25 November 2003, leaving the show on 23 February 2006. He made a return to the soap after a five-year gap on 16 August 2011.

The role was created specially for Magasiva and Vinnie is known for his party-loving and easy-going ways. His introduction saw a new group of young characters that formed a demographic for "hip, young things". Usually involved in comedic relief, Vinnie also participated in several melodramatic story lines such as the high-profile affair with his good friend Tama Hudson's (David Wikaira-Paul) girlfriend Shannon Te Ngaru (Amber Curreen). The storyline was named as a highlight of the 2004 season and cemented Vinnie's label as a "heart throb". Magasiva quit the role in 2006 and the character was written out when he accidentally impregnated tourist girlfriend – Jemima Hampton (Liesha Ward Knox). Vinnie made his return in 2011 and in the intervening years, the characters family was introduced, making the soap's first ever Polynesian family unit.

The character was well received and remains known as a heart throb, with Magasiva beating out his brother Robbie for "Hottest Male" in the TV Guide Best on the Box Awards 2012. Vinnie has also been named as one of the fans favourite characters and Magasiva, the favourite actor.

Creation and casting
Pua Magasiva had previously auditioned successfully for the guest role of Elvis Iosefa, the cousin of established character Louie in 1999. He appeared for several episodes; however, four years later, he was offered the full-time role of Vinnie Kruse, a core cast member. Vinnie made his first appearance in late 2003. The character was said to bring rebellion to the nurses and Magasiva hoped the character portrayed Pacific Islanders correctly, stating; "I wanted to make Vinnie very cultural, a character that Pacific Island people can relate to." Magasiva soon decided to try his luck elsewhere and quit the role. The character departed in early 2006 and early reports suggested he was axed as part of a large cast overhaul at the time; however, this was not the case. In reality, Magasiva's resignation brought on the large cast overhaul, which was an attempt by producers to represent a culturally proportional society after the exit of the shows only Pacific Islander. Magasiva soon regretted the decision, stating: "I took a risk and I left. The work didn't come." Magasiva returned to the role after five years in August 2011. In 2015 Magasiva announced he would stay with the show "as long as they'll have [him]" and expressed his desire for Vinnie to become the next Chris Warner (the show's longest running character). In late 2015 online rumours surfaced that Magasiva had left the show, though he denied this the following month. Following a series of controversial actions off-screen, Magasiva departed the soap opera in 2018.

Storylines
Judy Brownlee (Donogh Rees) hires Vinnie in late 2003 and he instantly gets on the other nurses' nerves with his party boy ways. In 2004, Vinnie starts an affair with good friend Tama's (David Wikaira-Paul) girlfriend Shannon Te Ngaru (Amber Curreen). The two go public but Vinnie realises she loves Tama more and they broke up. Vinnie is deeply in love with Tania Jeffries (Faye Smythe) but the presence of Mark Weston (Tim Foley) drives the two apart and Vinnie starts to date Jemima Hampton (Liesha Ward Knox). Vinnie is promoted to charge nurse but the pressure proves too much; he resigns from nursing to become a paramedic. However, when he witnesses a murder scene, Vinnie returns to nursing. Jemima falls pregnant, scaring Vinnie, and the two break up. However, in 2006 the lure of being a father proves too much and Vinnie travels to the United Kingdom to live with Jemima and his child.

Vinnie returns to Shortland Street in August 2011 and quickly gains a job. He reveals to his good friend Nicole (Sally Martin) that he had lost his son in a custody battle with Jemima and struggled to cope with the loss. Vinnie starts to date Brooke Freeman (Beth Allen) but her manipulative ways drive him away and he briefly dates her sister Bree (Rachel Blampied) before she too, drives him away with her antagonistic personality. In November 2012, Vinnie begins to date Emma Franklin (Amy Usherwood). The couple breaks up following Vinnie's drunken one-night stand with Emma's friend, Kylie (Kerry-Lee Dewing). Vinnie scandalously begins to date best friend Nicole but following a fire at the hospital, he realises he is in love with Kylie and ended things with Nicole. He and Kylie are short-lived, however, and Vinnie declares his love to Nicole to no success. However, after welcoming his son Michael (Duane Evans Jr.) permanently into his life, Nicole and Vinnie reconcile and she falls pregnant. Nicole gives birth on 11 December 2014 to a baby boy. As Vinnie looks up from his healthy child he is shocked to see Nicole having a seizure. Vinnie is relieved that Nicole survives, although she is in a coma. One week later, Nicole wakes up and is soon sent home. Leanne, Michael, Vinnie and Nicole discuss the baby's name and finally decide on the Samoan name Pele. Vinnie's worries grow as Nicole tells him that she no longer loves their own child. For Shortland Street's Easter special, Vinnie wants to prove he can be funny, so he volunteers to be the bunny for the hospital children's Easter party. At the picnic, the kids tie him up and he nearly drowns after falling into the paddle pool. Vinnie is humiliated. Vinnie and Leanne start to worry more for Nicole when they start to think Nicole is developing schizophrenia like her brother, Eric. Vinnie believes Nicole when she says she does not have schizophrenia, which causes Nicole to realise how much she loves him. And not long later she proposed. In early September, 2015 Vinnie and Nicole finally marry. However, the marriage is marred by infidelities, both marital, financial and at home.

In September, 2016 Nicole and Vinnie become joint owners of the IV Bar. Drew's younger brother Cam McCaskil, the head chef of the IV, is caught buying drugs on the property much to the horror of Nicole and Vinnie. In late 2016 Nicole shares a kiss with new nurse Ruby Flores; she confess to Vinnie. She then supports her mum after her new husband dies on their honeymoon; the distance leads to strain in the relationship with Vinnie.

In 2017, Nicole leaves nursing because she had broken protocol under urgency to let Jack Hannah help with a medical procedure well beyond his knowledge after the volcanic eruptions. She also falls out with Leanne because he never approved of Damo Johnson and Leanne re-entering a relationship for the third time. On top of the money issues, on August 1, 2017, Pele is diagnosed with Type I diabetes, and Michael is led astray by Felix, Deb's son. Michael later leaves for Singapore with his birth mother.

In 2018, Vinnie's latest investment plans fail again and after they try sharing the house and rent rooms, which includes Zoe Carlson who was later revealed to be Kate Hannah's sister, they decide to sell the house to Harper Whitley and Drew McCaskill. On May 1, Nicole is hit by Finn's car as Finn and Esther are setting off to Detroit to further their careers. Nicole survives but with injuries. After Finn admits to drink-driving, his frustration reaches a boiling point. He tells Dr. Walsh, the doctor that wants him to work in Detroit, about his DUI and accident. In May, Michael calls from Singapore, saying that Jemima had suffered a stroke, so Vinnie has to go to Singapore to help her. After she recovers, he stays because he is offered a role as an F&B department manager in one of the hotels that she manages. Although he tries many times to convince Nicole to fly Pele to Singapore to join him, Nicole suffers more panic attacks as the time draws close to her leaving. She rejects the offer for the final time and Vinnie ends their marriage due to irreparable differences.

Character development

Characterisation
Describing Vinnie, Magasiva stated: "Personality-wise we're a bit similar, very outgoing sort of characters. Even though he is always playing around, he does get serious at times – especially with his work. He is serious about it and wants to do well. Apart from that he likes to have fun, he likes to tease people and dance around and just have fun." His high energy leads to him being popular with both staff and patients. Vinnie loves to party and is a hit with women, even making moves on lesbian flatmate Maia Jeffries (Anna Jullienne). Magasiva hoped he could portray Vinnie so that he could embody the Polynesian population of New Zealand, stating: "He is very typical, but that's the way some of us are. We're being real people, I'm trying to be a real Samoan person, not trying to pretend to be someone else but just to be myself. And it shows when you see Vinnie, the way he talks — Pacific Islanders are loud. You know where they are from a mile away. You get a whole bunch of people laughing, that's a whole bunch of Pacific Islanders." In 2004 the character became part of a group of "hip, young things" alongside Tama Hudson (David Wikaira-Paul), Shannon Te Ngaru (Amber Curreen), Maia Jeffries, Norman Hanson (Jacob Tomuri) and Li Mei Chen (Li Ming Hu). The group embodied the "cool" and "groovy" demographic and were often found partying at their flat 'El Rancho' or the local bar. The group were described as: "witty, fun and spontaneous. They throw parties, play practical jokes, have complicated love lives, they stress about boy/girlfriends, best friends, what to do with their lives and what to wear to parties. What more could you want in a group of friends?" By the character's return in 2011, his cousin Maxwell Avia (Robbie Magasiva) has become the patriarch of a new family unit, cementing Vinnie in the middle and creating the soap's first-ever Polynesian family unit in the 20-year history. Following Maxwell's departure in 2012, Vinnie was integrated into scenes and storylines within the family unit, effectively uniting him as the patriarch of the characters.

Affair with Shannon Te Ngaru
In 2004, Vinnie begins an affair with the girlfriend of his good friend Tama Hudson (David Wikaira-Paul), Shannon Te Ngaru (Amber Curreen). The romance initially was hidden; however, it soon became public, a scene Wikaira-Paul enjoyed, "The most memorable thing for me this year was when Tama found out that Shannon was playing on him. I'd formed a huge bond with the character, so it was kind of personal. It surprised me how much I actually cared." Magasiva described Shannon as Vinnie's first love but noted she had become preoccupied with Tama, "Shannon's the first eye opener, the first girl who's really caught his heart. He's really serious about her. There's nothing that will hold him back. He's so in love with her." However, following the arrest of Tama's uncle Victor Kahu (Calvin Tuteao) and their checkered past together, Vinnie is suspicious as to whether Shannon loves him back. Curreen believed that Shannon was destined to love Tama not Vinnie: "Shannon wants Tama. She truly loves him, and now sees what a good thing they had. She feels terrible about herself – she has lost everything good in her life." The affair ends poorly for Vinnie, with Tama and Shannon marrying on Christmas Day 2004.

Relationship with Jemima Hampton
The arrival of Jemima Hampton (Liesha Ward Knox) in mid-2005 proved a new start for Vinnie who was struggling to withstand a relationship after his affair with Shannon Te Ngaru (Amber Curreen). Magasiva explained the attraction: "She's different. There is something about her that just excites him." However Ward Knox was hesitant that the two would have any long standing relationship, stating: "Jemima lives in her own little version of the world. She is the kind or person that would walk into a supermarket, take a can of spaghetti from the bottom of a stack and walk away; when it all comes crashing down behind her, she'd just say 'Oh! It must have been the air conditioning!' She just really has no idea of the problems she causes." Vinnie and Jemima end up together only for Vinnie to discover Jemima is married. She ends up leaving Vinnie upset and alone. However, Jemima returns in December 2005 and announces her pregnancy with Vinnie as the father. Vinnie ends up leaving Ferndale to live with Jemima and his unborn child in England. Offscreen, the two settle in after the birth of their son, Michael Kruse, but soon get into fights over Vinnie's party boy behaviour and when he misses Jemima's fathers birthday in 2011, she and Michael abandon him. In 2014 Jemima returned to the show with her son and a storyline took place where Jemima begins to redevelop her crush on Vinnie; Ward-Knox explained, "Jemima is dealing with a crumbling marriage, the prospect of being a solo mum again and Vinnie is a beacon of stability amongst the chaos ... Vinnie is willing to be so accommodating because he is one of the only people who truly understands her world and the way she operates within it."

Relationship with Nicole Miller 
When Vinnie Kruse arrives in 2011, Nicole makes an embarrassing move on him but they forget about it and become best friends. In 2013 Vinnie's and Nicole's feelings for each other increase but both of them are too shy to admit it. They finally do and get together for a while but eventually Vinnie falls in love with another nurse and breaks up with Nicole. Nicole, upset about another failed relationship, marries in November 2013. There, Vinnie realises what a huge mistake he had made breaking up with her. When Nicole gets into a relationship with Doctor Harper Whitley, Vinnie gives up on trying to get Nicole back. But when Nicole's mother Leanne comes, who disagrees with her sexuality, she convinces Vinnie to secretly try and win over Nicole's heart. Nicole quickly realises she is still in love with Vinnie and Harper at the same time. After switching from Vinnie to Harper a couple of times, Nicole finally chooses Vinnie. Only three weeks into their relationship, Nicole become's pregnant with Vinnie's child. In the end they choose to keep the baby. After giving birth, Nicole has a brain bleed which led to a seizure, resulting in her being in a coma, and Vinnie is devastated. Nicole wakes up after a week but life is hard for them. In a few months Nicole gets better and after her credit card scam, and Vinnie believing in her, she proposes. In September 2015 they get married. In the 2015 Christmas finale, Vinnie and his son Michael are held in a hostage situation along with Leanne and some staff and patients. Vinnie Michael and Leanne get out safely.

Their relationship goes badly for the next two years, with Vinnie's business coming unglued and Pele's diabetes also taking a toll on their relationship. Michael's move to Singapore to live with his biological mother, Jemima, also takes a toll.

In 2018, Michael calls Vinnie to say that Jemima has suffered a stroke, so Vinnie has to rush to Singapore. Once her condition stabilises, Vinnie is offered a role to work in one of the hotels that she manages.

Reception
Upon arrival it was clear that Vinnie was a heart throb, something Magasiva was not too sure about. The love triangle between Vinnie, Shannon and Tama was named as the most popular romance storyline to feature in 2004. Magasiva believed Vinnie's most memorable storyline was when he became a gigolo. In the 2011 Throng Shortland Street fan awards, Vinnie took out runner up for "Favourite Male Character" and Magasiva took out get runner up in "Favourite Actor". Vinnie's 2011 return was named as one of the highlights of the season and in 2013, was listed as the 9th best ever character return storyline on the soap by the Shortland Street website. Magasiva placed runner up for "Hottest Male" in the TV Guide Best on the Box Awards 2012, beating out his brother Robbie. Magasiva was nominated for "Favourite Actor" in the 2012 Nowie awards for his portrayal of Vinnie. A scene where Vinnie dreamt of his cousin's ex-wife, Vasa Levi (Teuila Blakely) making sexual moves on him, was named as one of the top moments of the 2012 season. In the Ferndale Talk Best of 2013 awards, Vinnie was voted "Favourite Character", with Magasiva also landing the "Favourite Actor" award. Magasiva also placed runner up for "Best Looking Male" In 2015 Magasiva received a nomination for "Best Actor" in the TV Guide Best on the Box Awards.

References

Shortland Street characters
Fictional nurses
Television characters introduced in 2003
Fictional paramedics
Male characters in television